The economy of Uttar Pradesh is the third largest of all the states in India. Nominal GDP of the state for the year 2022-23 is Rs. 20.48 trillion

on in 2022-23. Uttar Pradesh has an urban population of 44,495,063. According to the 2011 census report, 22.76% of Uttar Pradesh's population lives in urban areas. The state has 7 cities with populations exceeding 10 lakh (1 million) each. After partition in 2000 (Uttarakhand state carved out of it), the new Uttar Pradesh state produces about 92% of the economic output of the old Uttar Pradesh state. According to Planning Commission estimates for the year 2011–12, 29.4% of the state's total population was poor. However, updated findings by NITI Aayog based on NFHS-4 (2015–16), 37.79% of the population was found to be poor.

In the tenth five-year planning period of 2002 and 2007, Uttar Pradesh registered an annual economic growth rate of 5.2%. In the eleventh period, between 2007 and 2012, Uttar Pradesh registered an annual economic growth rate of 7%. In 2012–13 and 2013–14, however, the growth rate decreased to 5.9% and 5.1%, respectively, one of the lowest in India. The state's debt was estimated at 67% of the gross domestic product in 2005. In 2012, the state was one of the highest receivers of overall remittances to India which stood at $46.75 billion (3,42,884.05 crore), along with Kerala, Tamil Nadu, and Punjab. Additionally, the state government has selected seven cities for Metro train projects: Meerut, Allahabad, Gorakhpur, Agra, Kanpur, Lucknow, and Varanasi. The Lucknow Metro and Kanpur Metro projects were completed in September 2017 and December 2021 respectively. Uttar Pradesh is an agrarian state, and the highest producer of wheat (30% of the nation's supply).

Agriculture, livestock and fishing 

Uttar Pradesh is a major contributor to the national food grain stock. In 2013–14, this state produced 5 crores (50.05 million) tonnes of food grain, 18.90% of the country's total production. This is partly due to the fertile regions of the Indo-Gangetic plain and partly due to irrigation facilities such as canals and tube wells. Lakhimpur Kheri is a densely populated sugar-producing district in the country. It has been the most common producer of food grains in India since the 1950s, due to high-yielding varieties of seed, greater availability of fertilisers, and increased use of irrigation. Western Uttar Pradesh is more advanced in terms of agriculture as compared to the other regions in the state. The majority of the state's population depends upon farming activities. Wheat, rice, pulses, oilseeds, and potatoes are major agricultural products. Sugarcane is the most important cash crop throughout the state. Uttar Pradesh is one of the most important states in India as far as horticulture is concerned. Mangoes are also produced in the state.

Industry 

UP has witnessed rapid industrialisation in the recent past, particularly after the launch of policies of economic liberalisation in the country. As of March 1996, there were 1,661 medium and large industrial undertakings and 2,96,338 small industrial units employing 18.3 lakh persons. The per capita state domestic product was estimated at 7,263 in 1997–98 and there has been a visible decline in poverty in the state. However, nearly 40 percent of the total population lives below the poverty line.

There are numerous types of minerals in the state and many industries have come up based on these minerals. There are several cement plants in Mirzapur in the Vindhya region, a bauxite-based aluminium plant in the Banda region, and the Sonbhadra region. In the hilly regions of the state, many non-metallic minerals are found which are used as industrial raw materials. Coal deposits are found in the Singrauli region. Nevertheless, the state is poor in mineral resources. The only considerable deposits are of limestone in the Mirzapur district. These are being extracted and are used largely in cement manufacture.

Uttar Pradesh has a booming electronics industry, especially in the UP-Delhi-NCR and Lucknow-Kanpur Corridors where many electronics units are produced.

Cottage industries, such as handloom and handicrafts, have traditionally provided livelihood to a large number of people in the state. These industries include:
 Varanasi is a world-famous centre of handloom woven, embroidered textiles; the main products are Zari-embroidery and brocade-work on silk sarees. Lucknow is a centre of 'Chikan' embroidery, renowned for its grace and delicacy, a skill more than 200 years old. Uttar Pradesh produces about 15% of the total fabric production of the country, employs about 30% of the total workforce of artisans in India, and is responsible for an annual production of about US$0.1 million in the state.
 Varanasi is well known for manufacturing the diesel-electric locomotives at Banaras Locomotive Works. The workshop at DLW is further upgraded to manufacture electric locomotives for the Indian Railways. It is the largest diesel-electric locomotives manufacturer in India.
 The state has two major production centres of leather and leather products, with over 11,500 units; Agra and Kanpur are the key centres. About 200 tanneries are located in Kanpur.
 Moradabad is renowned for brass work and has carved a niche for itself in the handicraft industry throughout the world. Lately, other products that are produced here like iron sheet metalwares, aluminium artworks, woodworks, and glasswares have become popular with numerous foreign buyers, and are therefore being exported in large quantities. On average Moradabad exports goods worth 3000–4000 crore each year, which constitutes 40% of total exports from India under this category.
 Dibiyapur is a notable industrial town in the Kanpur–Agra region. The town is well equipped with industries. Many small scale industries also operate in the town. Agriculture being the most popular occupation in the rural sides of the town, shops, and organised retail outlets also serve as "money raisers in the town".

Large-scale industries	Edit
Dibiyapur is a notable industrial town of Auraiya district which has installations of India's leading public sector enterprises viz.

Cycle power plant of NTPC.[15]
Pata Petrochemical plant
Gas compressor station of GAIL[16] (previously known as Gas Authority of India Limited).
Small-scale industries	Edit
The Rice-mills and Dal-mills are working well. Other than these mills some steel furniture and cement products small scale industries are there in town located at different places. The raw material for these small-scale industries is imported from Agra and Kanpur. Mainly, the rice, pulses and desi ghee is transported at large scale to the other districts and states. In the Dibiyapur town itself the wooden furniture work is on large scale and due to its cost and quality factor, the furniture has made a good place in the market of nearby districts.
 Meerut is one of the biggest gold markets in Asia. It is one of the largest exporters of sports-related items and musical instruments in the country.
 Bulandshahr is renowned for Khurja Pottery worldwide. There are nearly 23 export-oriented units and they are exported to foreign countries such as United Kingdom, United States, Australia, New Zealand, United Arab Emirates, and others. The Sikandrabad industrial area, developed by UPSIDC, has a large number of national and multinational companies working here successfully.
 Prayagraj city is home to glass and wire-based industry. The main industrial areas of Prayagraj are Naini and Phulpur, where several public and private sector companies have offices and factories. Bharat Petroleum Corporation Limited, India's largest oil company (which is state-owned), is constructing a 7 million MTPA (70 lakh tonnes per annum) capacity refinery in Lohgara with an investment estimated at ₹6,200 crore. Allahabad Bank, which began operations in 1865, Bharat Pumps & Compressors and A. H. Wheeler and Company have their headquarters in the city. Major companies in the city are Reliance Industries, ITI Limited, BPCL, Dey's Medical, Food Corporation of India, Raymond Synthetics, Triveni Sheet Glass, Triveni Electroplast, EMC Power Ltd, Steel Authority of India, HCL Technologies, Indian Farmers Fertiliser Cooperative (IFFCO), Vibgyor Laboratories, Geep Industries, Hindustan Cable, Indian Oil Corporation Ltd, Baidyanath Ayurved, Hindustan Laboratories.

Minerals and heavy industries 

Ghaziabad, Gautam Buddh Nagar, Kanpur, Faizabad, Sonbhadra, Mirzapur, and Balrampur are the most industrious areas in the state.

Mathura Refinery situated in Mathura is the only oil refinery in Uttar Pradesh, and is the 6th largest oil refinery in India.

Handloom and handicrafts 

Handlooms and handicrafts are a very important source of income in UP. There are thousands of power looms and handlooms in the state, most of which are situated in eastern UP. Many people depend on it for their livelihood. Main centres in eastern UP include Tanda, Varanasi, Azamgarh, Bhadohi, Mirzapur, Mau and Mau Aima (Prayagraj). In Western UP some of the important centres are Meerut, Etawah, Etah and Kasganj. In Eastern UP, Tanda is a small town with a population of approximately 1,50,000 people with over 1,00,000 power looms. The main products include Lungis, Gamchas, Shawls, Rumaal, and garment clothes.

One District One Product Scheme 
It is a State Government scheme to encourage local handicrafts and specialized product from each district by helping workers financially. By providing them machineries and tools government helps small local workers.

Services 
The service industry plays a large role in the economy of Uttar Pradesh. It contributed nearly 49% of the gross state domestic product in 2021–22. Uttar Pradesh is the 'IT-Hub' of North India, with a share of software exports next to that of Karnataka. But unlike South Indian states, IT enterprises are limited to particular areas only, such as Noida, Greater Noida and Ghaziabad, which lie in the National Capital Region (NCR), commercial capital Kanpur and in the state capital Lucknow.

Noida is also famous for TV News broadcasters. Almost all News channels such as ABP News, Zee News and Mahua News are located in Film City.

Infrastructure 

The infrastructure in UP is improving in comparison to the other advanced states of India. In 2013, the Government of India declared the construction of Chaudhary Charan Singh International Airport in Lucknow and Lal Bahadur Shastri Airport in Varanasi, and both became operational in 2016.Lucknow Metro and Kanpur Metro became operational in September 2017 and December 2021 respectively with Kanpur Metro being the fastest built metro network in India. The  Uttar Pradesh State Road Transport Corporation bus service is one of the largest in the country with more than 10,000 buses. UPSRTC ALSO introduced Volvo, Scania, and Janrath ac buses service across the state.

The length of the national highway and railway track is highest in India. A new international airport had been proposed in Gautambudh Nagar district passed by the central government and supposed to start by 2023. Kushinagar international airport also is due to become operational in 2021. Work has also started on Ayodhya airport. Uttar Pradesh has the most national highways and the state's 8th airport Bareilly Airport began operation in March 2021, with the first route between Bareilly and Delhi, the flight will take an hour. The Yamuna Expressway, which is between New Delhi to Agra, is one of the best highways in the country. In 2015, the state government started another expressway project between Agra to Lucknow that will reduce the journey time; it was inaugurated on 21 November 2016. On 31 December 2015, Prime Minister Narendra Modi announced an expressway between New Delhi and Meerut, which will cost 7,500 crore. It will reduce the journey time to one hour. Delhi-Meerut expressway was opened for public use in April 2021.In 2018 four new expressways - Purvanchal expressway, Bundelkhand expressway, Kanpur-Lucknow expressway, Gorakhpur Link expressway, Ganga expressway, Ballia link expressway are being constructed. Purvanchal expressway has been opened for public use in February 2022, while the Bundelkhand expressway has started operating in July2022.

Tourism 

Among all the monuments, the Taj Mahal, Agra (5.65 million) was the most visited monument in 2018-19 for domestic visitors followed by Red Fort (3.43%) and Qutub Minar, Delhi (2.64 million). In respect of foreign visitors Taj Mahal, Agra (10.87 million) was the most visited monument, in FY 2018–19, followed by Agra Fort, Agra (0.52 million) and Qutab Minar, Delhi (0.33 million).

Education 

The total literacy rate of Uttar Pradesh is 67.68% which is less than average literacy rate 72.98% of India.

Poverty 

According to Niti Aayog's Multidimensional Poverty Index (MPI) based on NFHS-4, 37.79% population of Uttar Pradesh is poor.

See also 
 Economy of India
 Economy of Madhya Pradesh
 Economy of Bihar
 Economy of Uttarakhand

References